Cotillion is a Regency romance novel by Georgette Heyer published in 1952. It is one of the most light-hearted of Heyer's romances, avoiding the mystery, intrigue, and sensational events present in many of her novels. The story is set in 1816.

Plot summary

Heroine Kitty Charing has been brought up in rural isolation by her rich, miserly, and eccentric guardian, Matthew Penicuik (pronounced PENNY-cook), whom she calls Uncle Matthew. Uncle Matthew makes the whimsical decision to name Kitty as his heiress, but only if she marries one of his extensive collection of great-nephews, the offspring of his assorted and much-loathed sisters' children.

Uncle Matthew expects that Kitty will marry Jack Westruther, his favourite great-nephew, and Kitty would be only too happy to comply: she has adored Jack for years.  But Jack, while he intends someday to wed Kitty (believing that Uncle Matthew's money must be willed either to her or to him), prefers to lead a rakish lifestyle as long as possible.  Confident that Kitty will not accept any of his cousins, Jack declines to attend the family party at which Uncle Matthew intends for his great-nephews to propose to Kitty.

Kitty, greatly upset by the absence of Jack and by the possibility of becoming destitute should she not accept one of the great-nephews, is further dismayed by the proposals she receives.  First, there is doltish Lord Dolphinton ("Dolph"), an impoverished Irish peer under his mother's thumb. Dolph is clearly proposing because his mother wants Uncle Matthew's money. Then there is Reverend Hugh Rattray, who assures Kitty that he is very fond of her, and that she will make a very suitable wife when her youthful levity has been tempered, for he pities the fact she is a destitute orphan, to her scorn.

When another great-nephew arrives, Kitty hails him with relief. Freddy Standen is rich, good-natured, unaware of Uncle Matthew's intentions, and has no intention of marrying.  Nevertheless, Kitty begs him to propose to her and invite her to London to reintroduce her to his parents, whom she has not seen for some time. She assures Freddy that once she has visited London for a month, she will break off the engagement and live quietly thereafter. When she threatens to cry, Freddy is too mortified to do anything but agree.  She does not tell Freddy that she really hopes to make Jack jealous and force him to propose to her.  Freddy suspects she has something up her sleeve but does not know what.

Uncle Matthew, unconvinced by the announced engagement, guesses exactly what Kitty is up to; since it falls in with his own wishes, he allows Kitty to go to London. At the same time, he assures her that he will not tolerate being left for more than a month with "that Fish"—Miss Fishguard, Kitty's governess, who will stand in as housekeeper during Kitty's absence.

The complications that ensue are reflected in the title: a cotillion was originally a dance for four couples.

Characters

Mr Matthew Penicuik - a miserly, selfish, gouty, and irascible older man with digestive difficulties who received a good inheritance from his father then made a large fortune draining the Fen country who lives exclusively and reclusively at his country estate, Arnside House. His siblings, four older sisters, have all predeceased him; he is about to make his will; Kitty and Fish suspect that he was in love with her mother as he keeps a miniature portrait of her shut up in his desk.

Miss Catherine 'Kitty' or 'Kit' Charing - the kind, pretty, petite 19-year-old brunette heroine. An orphan adopted by Mr Penicuik, daughter of his boyhood friend, and prospective heiress to his fortune (of about £20,000 per year) only if she has married one of his great-nephews; she has been frugally managing Mr. Penicuik's household since she was sixteen; her father, Thomas 'Tom' Charing, was from an excellent family but left impoverished by his father; her beautiful mother, Désirée Charing (née Evron) was of a French émigré family who were temporarily in England and was not nobly born; Kitty is the last of the Charings; her father died when Kitty was a toddler so 'Uncle Matthew' adopted her; his great-nephews always called her 'cousin' and sometimes erroneously suspected that she was his daughter; there was nothing for Kitty to inherit from her father.

Mr Jack Westruther -	Mr Penicuik's favourite great-nephew (grandson of his favourite sister, Rosie), untitled but a Corinthian of high social status, a tall, very handsome alpha male, a selfish rake, dangerous flirt, powerful sportsman, and gamester with a ready sense of humour who has already gone through much of his own fortune.

The Honourable Frederick 'Freddy' Standen - the quiet wealthy oldest son and heir of a Viscount, another of Mr Penicuik's great-nephews, younger brother to Lady Buckhaven, a graceful, elegant dandy known for his exquisite taste; slender and of average height and looks; a kind young man about town, who agrees to help Kitty take a jaunt to London under the guise of an engagement. He is amiable, practical, socially adept, modest amongst his peers, responsible, and prefers to mind his own business; he has lodgings in Ryder Street in London. 	

George Rattray, Lord Biddenden - a patriarchal Baron, another of Mr Penicuik's great-nephews but not Kitty's suitor as he is already married, older brother to Hugh, Biddenden Manor is located fifteen miles from his brother's home at Garsfield Rectory; his other brother, Captain Claud Rattray, is serving with his regiment in France; his sisters are married.

The Honourable and Reverend Hugh Rattray - a Rector, another of Mr Penicuik's great-nephews, younger brother of George; tall and handsome but unromantic and austere, scholarly and boring; he lives at Garsfield Rectory, a living bestowed by Mr. Penicuik, less than ten miles from Arnside.

Foster or 'Dolph', Lord Dolphinton -	a 27-year-old impoverished Irish Earl, another of Mr Pencuik's great-nephews (grandson of his sister Cornelia), an only child born two months prematurely, he is a slow-witted and dominated and frightened by his mother; excellent with horses, both riding and driving; would prefer to live and breed horses at Dolphinton House, his rural estate in Ireland; in London, he and his mother live at the Dolphinton house in Grosvenor Place.

Augusta, Lady Dolphinton, née Skirling - a domineering, proud, ill-natured dowager Countess, Foster's mother, her late husband was Mr Penicuik's nephew, despised by Mr Penicuik she is barred from Arnside by his orders to his staff, she controls her son's finances and has his servants spy upon his activities, she threatens to have him declared a lunatic and committed to an asylum if he disobeys her.

Miss Hannah Plymstock - the stout, homely sister of a Cit and Revolutionary who is a tradesman as was his father; he dislikes the aristocracy; she lives with her brother, Sam Plymstock, his wife, and his children at 17 Keppel Street; she is about Dolph's age and is unromantic, strong-minded, blunt, calm, and patient; has no fortune; met Dolph at Cheltenham the previous year. 		

Margaret 'Meg', Lady Buckhaven, née Standen - Freddy's flighty 18-month-older sister; a very pretty lively blue-eyed wispy blonde with poor fashion sense; married less than a year to a Baron, her husband is newly departed as part of at least a year-long diplomatic mission to China, she is expecting their first child in several months; lives in the Buckhaven mansion in London's Berkeley Square; she is very fond of her doting affluent husband who is many years her senior.

Mr. Camille Evron, 'Chevalier d'Evron' - Kitty's handsome and fashionable French cousin, the son of her mother's brother, a gamester and adventurer on a visit to London and lodging in Duke Street, Kitty had previously only met her maternal uncle, Armand Evron, and Camille and his brother, André, once when they were children and they came uninvited to Arnside to see her and were speedily sent away by Mr. Penicuik; Camille spent his childhood in England so is very fluent in English; Camille's parents and brother live in France where his father owns several successful gaming establishments in Paris.
	
Miss Olivia Broughty - a very beautiful debutante, biddable but afraid of her mother, under extreme pressure to marry well, befriended by Kitty after a chance meeting when shopping; embarrassed by her mother's vulgar manners.

Mrs. Broughty - Olivia's mother, the widow of Oliver Broughty, a wellborn but not wealthy soldier ("loose screw") and she with a suspected scandalous past, not gently born herself, when she came to London to launch Olivia into society they were rejected by nobly born connections (a distant cousin of her husband's, Lady Batterstown, who is a friend of Lady Legerwood) and were left to stay with her vulgar sister's family, the Scortons, in Hans Crescent, an unfashionable part of town; encroaching, calculating and severely critical; her younger daughters are Amelia (15), Jane, and Selina, but the eldest, Olivia, was the loveliest.

The Scortons - déclassé family connections of Miss Broughty, including Olivia's 'Aunt Matty' (Mrs. Scorton) a good-natured, vulgar woman, her uncle (Mr. Scorton), and her cousins, Mr. Thomas 'Tom' Scorton, Miss Eliza 'Lizzie' Scorton, and Miss Susan 'Sukey' Scorton (engaged to Mr. Malham).

Lord and Lady Legerwood, Emma Standen - Freddy's parents, a Viscount and Viscountess, only the three eldest of their six children, are not living in their London home on Mount Street (Meg and Freddy each have their own home or lodging while Charles, their second son, is at Oxford), the youngest three (two daughters, Fanny and Caroline, and a son, Edmund) are still in the schoolroom, Stylish, pretty, and good-natured, Lady Legerwood is Mr. Penicuik's niece, the daughter of his third sister, Charlotte. Lord Legerwood is elegant, intelligent, kind, and perceptive. 
	
Miss 'Fish' Fishguard - Kitty's fond governess and timid companion, daughter of a clergyman; a gray-haired spinster in her early 40s, often foolishly romantic and addicted to quoting from poems in general conversation; she also was required to manage Mr Penicuik's household until Kitty was sixteen and took over those duties.	

Sir Henry Gosford - a wealthy elderly roué.

Lady Maria Yalding - a wellborn but stout and rudely arrogant widow; one of Lord Annerwick's five plain daughters; her elder sister, Lady Jane, lives with her as a companion; her grandfather squandered the family wealth so she married Mr. Yalding, an ungenteel wealthy merchant, who has been dead for a couple of years and left her his entire fortune of about £100,000.

References

Novels by Georgette Heyer
British historical novels
1953 British novels
Fiction set in 1816
Novels set in the 1810s
Heinemann (publisher) books
Regency romance novels